Multivariate is the quality of having multiple variables.

It may also refer to:

In mathematics
 Multivariable calculus
 Multivariate function
 Multivariate polynomial
 Multivariate interpolation
 Multivariate optimization

In computing
 Multivariate cryptography
 Multivariate division algorithm
 Multivariate optical computing

In statistics
 Multivariate analysis
 Multivariate random variable
 Multivariate regression
 Multivariate statistics

See also
 Univariate
 Bivariate (disambiguation)